Maneh and Samalqan County, or Mana and Samangan (Maneh va Samalqan) is in North Khorasan province, Iran. The capital of the county is the city of Ashkhaneh. At the 2006 census, the county's population was 91,884 in 23,040 households. The following census in 2011 counted 103,944 people in 28,261 households. At the 2016 census, the county's population was 101,727 in 29,624 households.

Administrative divisions

The population history and structural changes of Maneh and Samalqan County's administrative divisions over three consecutive censuses are shown in the following table. The latest census shows three districts, six rural districts, and four cities.

References

 

Counties of North Khorasan Province